Samantha van Diemen (born 28 January 2002) is a Dutch footballer who plays as defender for Fortuna Sittard in the Eredivisie.

Club career
Van Diemen played for CTO, an educational team organized by the national football association KNVB. When CTO stopped in 2018, Van Diemen went to Ajax Talententeam, the female youth team of Ajax. In the summer of 2019 she signed a contract for the Ajax Vrouwen-squad. On October 25 she played her first official match, the second half of the game against Heerenveen for the Eredivisie Cup. In July 2021 she signed a contract with Feyenoord to continue her career.

International career
On 15 February 2018 Van Diemen played her first international game for Oranje U16. She then already played for Oranje U17. In August 2019 she also played for Oranje U19. Since 2021, she plays for Oranje U23.

Van Diemen became the first ever female Feyenoord player to play for the Netherlands, when she started on 29 November 2021 in a 0–0 draw, during a friendly match against Japan.

Honours

Club
Ajax
 Eredivisie (1): 2019–20

International
Oranje U16
Oranje U17
Oranje U19
Oranje U23

References

External links

Profile at onsoranje.nl 

Living people
Dutch women's footballers
Eredivisie (women) players
AFC Ajax (women) players
Women's association football defenders
2002 births
Dutch people of Dominican Republic descent
Sportspeople of Dominican Republic descent
Netherlands women's international footballers
Footballers from Leiden
Feyenoord (women) players
Fortuna Sittard (women) players